Led Zeppelin's 1971 North American Tour was the seventh concert tour of North America by the English rock band. The tour commenced on August 7 and concluded on 17 September 1971. It included two warm-up shows in Montreux, Switzerland.

This tour took place just prior to the release of the band's fourth album. The band had hoped to release this album in time for the tour, but various delays prevented this from occurring.

This was the longest break that the band had from touring North America to date, with their last tour there having taken place almost a year previously. During the interim,  the hard rock band Grand Funk Railroad had asserted its influence on the American music market, and Led Zeppelin was keen to re-establish their live reputation through this stint of concert performances.

The new material from the fourth album which was presented by the band on stage was very well received by audiences, which helped to ensure massive sales of that album when it was eventually released in November 1971.

The tour is also notable for the high frequency of crowd disturbances which occurred at the concerts, including those at New York City, Toronto and Boston, as the bootlegs of these concerts attest.

Before this tour, Robert Plant shaved off his beard, a style which he and the rest of his bandmates had adopted the year before. John Paul Jones followed suit a month later. However, Jones would later grow a beard in late 1972 and keep it until March 1973, and then have a mustache for part of the 1973 North American Tour, and also have a beard from late 1975 to early 1977.

It was on this tour that the notorious "Folding Chair Incident" took place. On August 26, at the show in Houston, several fans threw folding chairs at the stage in protest to what were perceived as overpriced tickets. No one was injured, and the show continued without any more interruptions.

On this tour, the band grossed $1 million.

Tour set list
The fairly typical set list for the tour was:

"Walk Don't Run" (only on 22 August)
"Immigrant Song" (Page, Plant)
"Heartbreaker" (Bonham, Page, Plant)
"Since I've Been Loving You" (Page, Plant, Jones)
"Out on the Tiles" (intro) (Page, Plant, Bonham) / "Black Dog" (Page, Plant, Jones)
"Dazed and Confused" (Page)
"Stairway to Heaven" (Page, Plant)
"Celebration Day" (Jones, Page, Plant)
"That's the Way" (Page, Plant)
"Going to California" (Page, Plant)
"What Is and What Should Never Be" (Page, Plant)
"Moby Dick" (Page, Jones, Bonham)
"Whole Lotta Love" (Bonham, Dixon, Jones, Page, Plant)

Encores (variations of the following list):
"Communication Breakdown" (Bonham, Jones, Page)
"Organ Solo" (Jones) / "Thank You" (Page, Plant)
"Rock and Roll" (Page, Plant, Jones, Bonham) (19 & 21 August and 3, 7 & 13 September)
"Weekend" (Post) (19 & 21 August)

There were some set list substitutions, variations, and order switches during the tour.

Tour dates

References

External links
Comprehensive archive of known concert appearances by Led Zeppelin (official website)
Led Zeppelin concert setlists
U.S. 1971 tour

Sources
Lewis, Dave and Pallett, Simon (1997) Led Zeppelin: The Concert File, London: Omnibus Press. .

Led Zeppelin concert tours
1971 concert tours